The Carbonaro Effect is an American hidden camera practical joke reality television series hosted by magician and prankster Michael Carbonaro, who performs tricks on people caught on hidden camera. It debuted on April 1, 2014, and is currently airing on truTV. To promote the second half of the first season, TBS aired a two-hour marathon on October 30, 2014. The second season premiered on April 1, 2015; the third season premiered on February 1, 2017; and the fourth season premiered on May 17, 2018, along with a new insider series titled The Carbonaro Effect: Inside Carbonaro. On October 11, 2019, it was announced that the fifth season would premiere on November 7, 2019. Due to the COVID-19 pandemic, the series has been on hiatus. As of 2023, it is unknown if it will continue after its fifth season.

Episodes

The Carbonaro Effect: Inside Carbonaro
The Carbonaro Effect: Inside Carbonaro is a show on which previously aired episodes are shown again with new facts and bonus scenes, presented by Carbonaro himself. The first episode aired on May 17, 2018 after the Season 4 premiere.

The Carbonaro Effect: Double Takes
The Carbonaro Effect: Double Takes features previously unaired reactions to tricks from earlier shows, with Carbonaro commenting throughout.

References

External links

2010s American comedy television series
2010s American reality television series
2020s American comedy television series
2020s American reality television series
2014 American television series debuts
American hidden camera television series
American television magic shows
English-language television shows
TruTV original programming
Television series impacted by the COVID-19 pandemic